Kingkel is a putative small branch of the Pama–Nyungan family in Queensland, consisting of:

Bayali, 
Dharumbal.

The two languages are not close.

Bowern (2011) reclassified Darumbal as a Maric language, but did not address Bayali. Bouckaert, Bower, and Atkinson (2018), based on more data and languages of the region, classify Darumbal as a sister of Mbabaram (and therefore related to Maric languages, though as the first to branch off within that group). Bayali is grouped with Waka-Kabi languages to the south.

References

 
Indigenous Australian languages in Queensland